Kamnitsa  is a village in Võru Parish, Võru County, in southeastern Estonia.

References

 
Kamnitsa Has a population of 8 according to a study in 2011 done by StatisticsEstonia

Villages in Võru County